John Morris, Baron Morris of Aberavon,  (born 5 November 1931) is a British politician. He was a Labour Party Member of Parliament for over 41 years, from 1959 to 2001, which included a period as Secretary of State for Wales from 1974 to 1979 and as Attorney General between 1997 and 1999. He is the only living former Labour MP who was first elected in the 1950s. He is also the last surviving member of Harold Wilson's 1974–76 cabinet, and is the current longest-serving Privy Counsellor. His combined parliamentary service has totalled over 60 years. Following the death of Robert Lindsay, 29th Earl of Crawford on 18 March 2023, Morris and Stratton Mills became the surviving former MPs with the earliest date of first election, having first entered Parliament at the 1959 general election.

Background and education
Morris was born in Capel Bangor, Aberystwyth, Cardiganshire. He was educated at Ardwyn School, the University College of Wales, Aberystwyth, and Gonville and Caius College, Cambridge.

Professional career
Morris was a barrister and was called to the Bar by Gray's Inn in 1954. He practised at 2 Bedford Row Chambers, took silk in 1973 and was made a Bencher of Gray's Inn in 1984. Between 1982 and 1997, he was a Recorder of the Crown Court.

Political career
Morris represented Aberavon as its Labour MP from 1959 onwards, and was the longest serving Welsh MP in Parliament, until his retirement in 2001, when he was succeeded by Hywel Francis. According to The Almanac of British Politics, Morris was a "moderate" Labour MP.

Morris served as Parliamentary Under-Secretary of State at the Ministry of Power and the Ministry of Transport, and Minister of State at the Ministry of Defence. Having been sworn of the Privy Council in the 1970 Birthday Honours, Morris joined the Cabinet as Secretary of State for Wales between 5 March 1974 and 4 May 1979 and returned to Government as the Attorney General for England and Wales and Northern Ireland between 1997 and 1999, having shadowed the role since 1983. As such, he was one of only a small handful of Labour ministers to hold office under Harold Wilson, James Callaghan and Tony Blair.

Other positions held
Lord Morris has been Chancellor of the University of South Wales since its formation in 2013. The University of South Wales was formed by a merger between University of Glamorgan (where Lord Morris was Chancellor since 2002) and the University of Wales, Newport. He succeeded fellow Labour politician Lord Merlyn-Rees as the Chancellor for the University of Glamorgan. Lord Morris was President of the London Welsh Trust, which runs the London Welsh Centre, Gray's Inn Road, from 2001 until 2008. He is also a council member of The Prince's Trust.

Honours
Morris was raised to the peerage for life as Baron Morris of Aberavon, of Aberavon in the County of West Glamorgan and of Ceredigion in the County of Dyfed in the 2001 Dissolution Honours, was made Lord Lieutenant of Dyfed a year later and was appointed to the Order of the Garter as a Knight Companion (KG) in 2003.

Arms

References

External links
Profile on the University of Glamorgan website
Downing Street press notice September 2002
They Work for You.com

|-

|-

|-

|-

|-

|-

|-

|-

1931 births
Alumni of Aberystwyth University
Alumni of Gonville and Caius College, Cambridge
Association of Professional, Executive, Clerical and Computer Staff-sponsored MPs
Attorneys General for England and Wales
Attorneys General for Northern Ireland
British Secretaries of State
Welsh King's Counsel
Chancellors of the University of Glamorgan
Knights of the Garter
Welsh Labour Party MPs
Labour Party (UK) life peers
Living people
Lord-Lieutenants of Dyfed
Members of the Privy Council of the United Kingdom
Northern Ireland Government ministers
People educated at Ardwyn School, Aberystwyth
Politics of Neath Port Talbot
Secretaries of State for Wales
Welsh barristers
UK MPs 1959–1964
UK MPs 1964–1966
UK MPs 1966–1970
UK MPs 1970–1974
UK MPs 1974
UK MPs 1974–1979
UK MPs 1979–1983
UK MPs 1983–1987
UK MPs 1987–1992
UK MPs 1992–1997
UK MPs 1997–2001
Ministers in the Wilson governments, 1964–1970
Life peers created by Elizabeth II
Politicians awarded knighthoods